Breplogen Mountain is a broad mountain,  high, which is ice-covered except on its north and east sides, standing west of Austreskorve Glacier in the Mühlig-Hofmann Mountains of Queen Maud Land.

Discovery and naming
Breplogen Mountain was plotted from surveys and from air photos by the Sixth Norwegian Antarctic Expedition (1956–60) and named Breplogen (the "glacier plough").

See also
 List of mountains of Queen Maud Land
 Sengekoven Cirque

References

External links
 Scientific Committee on Antarctic Research (SCAR)
 

Mountains of Queen Maud Land
Princess Astrid Coast